Richard Francis Pirrie (15 April 1879 – 15 September 1962) was an Australian rules footballer who played with Melbourne in the Victorian Football League (VFL).

Family
The son of James Pirrie (1832-1898), and Mary Pirrie (1844-1931), née Murphy, Richard Francis Pirrie was born in Richmond, Victoria on 15 April 1879.

He married Isobel Agatha McGuire (1897-1982) on 16 July 1919.

Two of his sons, Dick Pirrie and Kevin Pirrie, played for Hawthorn; and his grandson, Stephen Pirrie, Kevin's son, played for Richmond.

Football

Melbourne (VFL)
He played 24 games, and kicked 11 goals for Melbourne in the VFL, over three seasons (1898 to 1900).

Richmond (VFA)
Cleared from Melbourne to Richmond in the Victorian Football Association (VFA) in 1901, he played 23 games for Richmond, and scored 11 goals, over to seasons (1901 and 1902).

Death
He died at his home in Hawthorn, Victoria on 15 September 1962.

See also
 List of Australian rules football families

Notes

External links 
 
 
 Demonwiki: Dick Pirrie
 R. "Dick" Pirie, The VFA Project.

1879 births
1962 deaths
Australian rules footballers from Melbourne
Melbourne Football Club players
Richmond Football Club (VFA) players
People from Richmond, Victoria